The Thing of all Swedes (allra Svía þing, Þing allra Svía, Disaþing,  or Kyndilþing) was the governing assembly held from pre-historic times to the Middle Ages at Gamla Uppsala, Sweden, occurring at the end of February or early March in conjunction with a great fair and a religious celebration called Dísablót. The Law of Uppland informs that it was at this assembly that the king proclaimed that the leidang would be summoned for warfare during the summer, and all the crews, rowers, commanders and ships were decided.

The name suggests that it replaced an older division where each of the folklands Tiundaland, Attundaland and Fjärdhundraland had their own things. All free men living in the realm and who were able to wield a weapon had the right to participate, and the assembly was led by the lawspeaker.

Icelandic historian Snorri Sturlusson, who was well-informed of Swedish matters and visited the country in 1219, explained in the Heimskringla (1225):

When the assembly was moved to Candlemas, it was renamed Kyndelsting (Old Swedish: Kyndilþing), but the name Dísaþing remained in use as the Disting for the great fair.

See also
 Thing (assembly)
 Thing of all Geats, an equivalent assembly of the Geats that took place in Skara.
 Norse law

References and footnotes

Political history of Sweden
Medieval Sweden
Thing (assembly)
Defunct unicameral legislatures
Norse paganism